The Nagnatae (Ναγνάται) or Magnatae (Μαγνάται) were a people of ancient Ireland, recorded in Ptolemy's 2nd century Geography as living in northern Connacht. O'Rahilly suggests a connection between the Nagnatae and the Fir Ól nÉcmacht, a people of early Connacht, assuming a degree of corruption in the transmission of both names.
For the town in their territory see Nagnata.

References

Ethnic groups in Ireland
Connacht
Prehistoric Ireland
Tribes of ancient Ireland